Max Wright (1943–2019) was an American actor.

Max Wright may also refer to:
 Max Wright (Australian footballer) (1901–1988), Australian footballer
 Max Wright (English footballer) (born 1998), English footballer
 Max Wright (rugby union) (born 1997), English rugby union player